Cameraria corylisella is a moth of the family Gracillariidae. It is known from Manitoba, Ontario, and Quebec in Canada, and Kentucky, Wisconsin, Maine, New York, Connecticut and Vermont in the United States.

The wingspan is 6.5–7 mm.

The larvae feed on Carpinus americana, Carpinus caroliniana, Corylus species (including Corylus americana) and Ostrya virginica. They mine the leaves of their host plant. The mine has the form of a nearly circular, brownish-yellow blotch mine on the upperside of the leaf. Larvae hibernate in a silken chamber.

References

Cameraria (moth)

Moths of North America
Lepidoptera of Canada
Lepidoptera of the United States
Moths described in 1871
Leaf miners
Taxa named by Vactor Tousey Chambers